The Divide may refer to:

Books
 The Divide (novel), a 1980 alternate history novel by William Overgard
 The Divide, novel by Nicholas Evans 2005 
 The Divide trilogy, a series of novels by Elizabeth Kay, or the first book in the trilogy
 The Divide: American Injustice in the Age of the Wealth Gap, a 2014 book by Matt Taibbi

Film and TV
 The Divide (2011 film), a nuclear-apocalyptic fiction film by Xavier Gens
 The Divide (2015 film), a documentary film by Katharine Round
 The Divide (2021 film), a/k/a La Fracture, a drama film by Catherine Corsini
 The Divide (TV series), a 2014 WeTV series

Music
 The Divide, album by Tom Waits and Scott Vestal 2011
 "The Divide", a song by Miss Kittin from On the Road
 "The Divide", a song by Tenacious D from The Pick of Destiny
 "The Divide", an alternative rock band from Manchester

Video games
 The Divide: Enemies Within, a 1996 video game

See also
 Divide (disambiguation)
 The Divided, an English metalcore band